Selfridge or variation may refer to:

People
 Andy Selfridge (born 1949), American former National Football League player
 Harry Gordon Selfridge (1856–1947), American-born founder of Selfridges Department Store 
 John Selfridge (1927–2010), American mathematician
 Oliver Selfridge (1926–2008), English computer scientist, a pioneer in artificial intelligence and grandson of Harry Gordon Selfridge
 Peter A. Selfridge (born 1971), United States Chief of Protocol (2014–2017)
 Rose Selfridge (1860–1918), American heiress and wife of Harry Selfridge
 Thomas Oliver Selfridge (1804–1902), United States Navy admiral
 Thomas Oliver Selfridge, Jr. (1836–1924), United States Navy admiral and son of Thomas O. Selfridge
 Thomas Selfridge (1882–1908), US Army lieutenant and the first person to die in a powered airplane crash

Places
 Selfridge, North Dakota, USA; a town
 Selfridge High School
 Selfridge Public School
 Selfridge Air National Guard Base, Michigan, USA; named for Thomas Selfridge
 Battery Selfridge, Fort Kamehameha, Pearl Harbor, Honolulu, Hawaii; an artillery battery
 Selfridges Building, Birmingham, England, UK; of the Selfridges department store chain; an award winning architectural design
 Selfridges, Oxford Street, London, England, UK; of the Selfridges department store chain; a listed building

Ships
 USS Selfridge, a U.S. Navy ship name
 USS Selfridge (DD-320), a United States Navy destroyer named for Thomas O. Selfridge
 USS Selfridge (DD-357), a United States Navy destroyer named for Thomas O. Selfridge and Thomas O. Selfridge, Jr.

Other uses
 Selfridges (aka Selfridge's), a chain of department stores in the United Kingdom
 Selfridge Prize, a prize awarded for the best paper at the Algorithmic Number Theory Symposium

See also

 
 
 Miss Selfridge, a British high street store chain
 Mr Selfridge, a British period TV drama about Harry Gordon Selfridge of Selfridge's department stores
 Selfridges, Oxford Street bombing 1975